T66 may refer to :
 Ericsson T66, a 2001 mobile phone
 Cooper T66, a 1963–64 racing car
 T66 (rocket launcher), a U.S. Army multiple rocket launcher of World War II